Mercy (Middle English, from Anglo-French merci, from Medieval Latin merced-, merces, from Latin, "price paid, wages", from merc-, merxi "merchandise") is benevolence, forgiveness, and kindness in a variety of ethical, religious, social, and legal contexts.

In the social and legal context, mercy may refer both to compassionate behavior on the part of those in power (e.g. mercy shown by a judge toward a convict), or on the part of a humanitarian third party, e.g., a mission of mercy aiming to treat war victims.

Definition
"Mercy" can be defined as "compassion or forbearance shown especially to an offender or to one subject to one's power"; and  also "a blessing that is an act of divine favor or compassion." "To be at someone's mercy" indicates a person being "without defense against someone."

Law and ethics

In a judicial context mercy is often termed "clemency". It is a sovereign prerogative that resides in the executive and is entirely discretionary. John Locke defined it as "the power to act according to discretion, for the public good, without the prescription of the Law, and sometimes even against it." The U.S. Court of Appeals for the Sixth Circuit explained that "The very nature of clemency is that it is grounded solely in the will of the dispenser of clemency. He need give no reasons for granting it or for denying it."

Religions
The concept of a merciful God appears in various religions, including Hinduism, Christianity, Judaism and Islam. Performing acts of mercy as a component of religious beliefs is also emphasized through actions such as the giving of alms, and care for the sick and Works of Mercy.

Christianity
Hebrews 4:16 says, "So let us confidently approach the throne of grace to receive mercy and to find grace for timely help." Grace and mercy are similar in that both are free gifts of God and both are dispensed absent any merit on the part of the recipient. Grace is the favor of God, a divine assistance. Grace is what one receives that they do not deserve while mercy is what one receives when they do not get that which they deserve.

An emphasis on mercy appears in the New Testament, for example in the Magnificat and Benedictus (Song of Zechariah), in Luke's Gospel, and in the Beatitudes in Matthew 5:7: "Blessed are the merciful: for they shall obtain mercy". In Ephesians 2:4 Apostle Paul refers to the mercy of God in terms of salvation: "God, being rich in mercy,... even when we were dead through our sins, made us alive together with Christ".

Psalm 117 calls upon all nations to praise the Lord, and that on account of his "merciful kindness". This is quoted by the Apostle Paul in Romans 15:11 to show that God has now fulfilled this prophecy and promise through Jesus Christ, who has been merciful in giving his life as a sacrifice for his people, both Jew and gentile.  reads:

This devotional element of mercy as part of the Christian tradition was echoed by Saint Augustine who called mercy "ever ancient, ever new". The Works of Mercy (seven corporal and seven spiritual works) are part of the Catholic and Eastern Orthodox traditions.

Roman Catholicism

In the encyclical Dives in misericordia ("Rich in Mercy") Pope John Paul II examines the role of mercy—both God's mercy, and also the need for human mercy. He sees in the Parable of the Prodigal Son (Luke 15:11-32) "the essence of the divine mercy". Having squandered his patrimony, justice would dictate that the prodigal should only expect to be received back as a hireling. The figure of the father is analogous to God as Father, who goes beyond the requirements of justice to welcome his son with compassion.

The Catechism of the Catholic Church emphasizes the importance of the Works of Mercy (item 2447) and in Roman Catholic teachings, the mercy of God flows through the work of the Holy Spirit. Roman Catholic liturgy includes frequent references to mercy, e.g., as in Kyrie eleison, Christe eleison: Lord have mercy, Christ have mercy.

Mercy has also been an important subject of Christian iconography. Since the Middle Ages, many representations in art encouraged people to practice the works of mercy and, as the art historian Ralf van Bühren explains using the example of Caravaggio, helped "the audience to explore mercy in their own lives".

In the 20th century, there was new focus on mercy in the Roman Catholic Church, partly due to the Divine Mercy devotion. The primary focus of the Divine Mercy devotion is the merciful love of God and the desire to let that love and mercy flow through one's own heart towards those in need of it. 
 
Pope John Paul II was a follower of the Divine Mercy devotion, due to Saint Mary Faustina Kowalska (1905–1938), who is known as the Apostle of Mercy.

A number of Roman Catholic shrines are specifically dedicated to Divine Mercy, e.g.
the Basilica of Divine Mercy in Krakow Poland, and the National Shrine of The Divine Mercy (Stockbridge, Massachusetts). During the dedication of the Basilica of Divine Mercy John Paul II quoted the Diary of Faustina and called mercy the "greatest attribute of God Almighty".

The first World Apostolic Congress on Mercy was held in Rome in April 2008 and was inaugurated by Pope Benedict XVI.

On 11 April 2015, at St. Peter's Basillica, in a Papal Bull of Indiction entitled Misericordiae Vultus ("The Face of Mercy"), Pope Francis proclaimed a Special and Extraordinary Holy Year Jubilee Year of Mercy, from December 8, 2015: Solemnity of the Immaculate Conception of the Blessed Virgin Mary, until November 21, 2016: the Solemnity of Our Lord Jesus Christ the King.  The theme of the Extraordinary Jubilee is taken from Luke 6:36, "Merciful, Like the Father".

Islam
In Islam the title "Most Merciful" (Al-Raheem) is one of the names of Allah and "Most Compassionate" (Al-Rahman), is the most common name occurring in the Quran. Rahman and Rahim both derive from the root Rahmat, which refers to tenderness and benevolence. As a form of mercy, the giving of alms (zakat) is the fourth of the Five Pillars of Islam and one of the requirements for the faithful.

Judaism
The Hebrew word  for mercy is Rachamim which is always in plural form so that it literally means "mercies". "Mercy includes showing kindness to those who don’t deserve it, and forgiving those that deserve punishment."

Mercy is one of the defining characteristics of God. Exodus 34:6 says: "The Lord, the Lord, a God merciful and gracious, slow to anger, and abounding in steadfast love and faithfulness." This is also emphasized in the context of the Babylonian exile in Isaiah: "For the Lord has comforted his people, and will have compassion on his suffering ones. But Zion said, 'The Lord has forsaken me, my Lord has forgotten me.' Can a woman forget her nursing child, or show no compassion for the child of her womb? Even these may forget, yet I will not forget you." (Isaiah 49:13-15) Also: "It is good to pray and fast, to be merciful and just." (Tobit 12:8)

When David, because of his sin, was told to choose between a three-year famine, pursuit by his enemies for three months, or a three-day pestilence, he chose the pestilence saying, "Let us fall by the hand of God, for he is most merciful; but let me not fall by the hand of man." Psalm 103:8 praises God for his mercy.

Other religions and beliefs
Kwan Yin the bodhisattva of mercy and compassion, is one of the best known and most venerated Bodhisattva in Asia.

Karuṇā (often translated as "compassion") is part of the beliefs of Hinduism, Buddhism and Jainism. Karuṇā is present in all schools of Buddhism and in Jainism it is viewed as one of the reflections of universal friendship.

The spiritual teacher Meher Baba described God as being "all-merciful and eternally benevolent" in his O Parvardigar prayer, and he held that we can approach God through the "invocation of His mercy."

Quotes
 "I have always found that mercy bears richer fruits than strict justice." ―Abraham Lincoln
 "For children are innocent and love justice, while most of us are wicked and naturally prefer mercy." ―G.K. Chesterton 
 "You cannot conceive, nor can I, of the appalling strangeness of the mercy of God." ―Graham Greene, Brighton Rock 
 "'What a pity that Bilbo did not stab that vile creature, when he had a chance!' Pity? It was Pity that stayed his hand. Pity, and Mercy: not to strike without need. And he has been well rewarded, Frodo. Be sure that he took so little hurt from the evil, and escaped in the end, because he began his ownership of the Ring so. With Pity." ―J.R.R. Tolkien, The Fellowship of the Ring

Literature
 In Shakespeare's The Merchant of Venice, Portia, disguised as young lawyer Balthazar, begs Shylock to show mercy to her client Antonio: 

 In O. Henry's A Retrieved Reformation, safecracker Jimmy Valentine betrays his identity and burglary skills in order to free a child accidentally trapped in a bank vault. A detective who has been pursuing him witnesses Valentine crack the safe. As Valentine subsequently surrenders, the detective pretends not to recognize him and walks away.

See also

 Mercy Corps
 Thirteen Attributes of Mercy
 Virgin of Mercy
 Works of Mercy
 Clementia

References 

Attributes of God in Christian theology
Ethical principles
Theories of law
Punishments
Divine Mercy
Virtue